I Still Believe in You is the fifth studio album from American country music artist Vince Gill. It was released in 1992 on MCA Nashville. It features the singles "I Still Believe in You" (Gill's first Number One country hit), "Don't Let Our Love Start Slippin' Away", "No Future in the Past," "One More Last Chance" and "Tryin' to Get Over You."

Track listing

Track listing (European version)
"I Still Believe in You" - 3:59
"Never Alone" (Rosanne Cash, Gill) - 3:34 1
"Nothing Like a Woman" - 4:54
"What's a Man to Do" (Curtis Wright) - 3:11 2
"Don't Let Our Love Start Slippin' Away" - 3:43
"Never Knew Lonely" (Gill) - 3:59 1
"Say Hello" - 2:46
"One More Last Chance" - 3:10
"Under These Conditions" - 3:04
"Pretty Words" - 2:31
"Love Never Broke Anyone's Heart" - 4:10
"Tryin' to Get Over You" - 3:43
"We Could Have Been" (Don Cook, Jarvis) - 3:29 1
"No Future in the Past" - 4:08
"Liza Jane" (Gill, Nielsen) - 2:53 2

1 

2

Personnel 

 Vince Gill –  lead vocals, backing vocals, acoustic guitar, electric guitar
 John Barlow Jarvis – keyboards
 Pete Wasner – keyboards
 Steve Nathan – Hammond B3 organ
 Richard Bennett – acoustic guitar
 Randy Scruggs – acoustic guitar
 Steuart Smith – electric guitar
 John Hughey – steel guitar
 Willie Weeks – bass
 Carlos Vega – drums
 Delbert McClinton – harmonica
 Andrea Zonn – fiddle, backing vocals
 Bob Bailey – backing vocals
 Kim Fleming – backing vocals
 Vicki Hampton – backing vocals
 Yvonne Hodges – backing vocals
 Alison Krauss – backing vocals
 Lou Reed – backing vocals
 Dawn Sears – backing vocals
 Harry Stinson – backing vocals
 Billy Thomas – backing vocals

Production 
 Tony Brown – producer 
 John Guess – recording, overdub recording, mixing 
 Russ Martin – overdub recording, second engineer 
 Marty Williams – overdub recording 
 Craig White – second engineer
 Milan Bodgan – digital editing 
 Glenn Meadows – mastering 
 Jessie Noble – project coordinator
 Jim Kemp – creative director 
 Katherine DeVault – art direction, design 
 Victoria Pearson Cameron – photography 
 Fitzgerald Hartley Co. – management

Chart performance

Weekly charts

Year-end charts

Certifications and sales

Album release

DVD disc

References

1992 albums
Vince Gill albums
MCA Records albums
Albums produced by Tony Brown (record producer)